George Clyde Windrow, Jr. (November 16, 1931 – March 23, 2019) was an American politician and soldier.

Biography
Windrow was born in Hondo, Texas. His parents were George C. Windrow, Sr. and Rhoda Mae Taylor Windrow. Windrow graduated from Thomas Jefferson High School, San Antonio, Texas, in 1949. Windrow went to University of Wisconsin from 1949 to 1951 and to Marquette University from 1951 to 1954. He lived in Cudahy, Wisconsin and worked as a drop forger in the manufacturing industry. Windrow was involved in the International Brotherhood of Boilermakers and Blacksmiths. He served in the Wisconsin State Assembly in 1955 and 1956 and was a Democrat. Windrow received his bachelor's degree in mechanical engineering from Texas A&M University in 1958 and his MBA from the George Washington University School of Business. He was commissioned a second lieutenant in the United States Army Reserve and retired as a colonel. Windrow lived in San Antonio, Texas.

Notes

External links

1931 births
2019 deaths
People from Hondo, Texas
People from Cudahy, Wisconsin
Military personnel from San Antonio
American mechanical engineers
Jefferson High School (San Antonio, Texas) alumni
Texas A&M University alumni
George Washington University School of Business alumni
Marquette University alumni
University of Wisconsin–Madison alumni
Democratic Party members of the Wisconsin State Assembly